Nicky Hayes is an established psychologist and author, who has written over 25 books on psychology, management and neuroscience and made significant contributions to psychology education, research methods and applied psychology.

Her books include specialised textbooks, e.g. "Fundamentals of Social Psychology" (Routledge) and "Doing Psychological Research" (Open University Press), supplementary publications such as the Student's Dictionary of Psychology and Neuroscience (with Peter Stratton and published by Taylor & Francis, now in its 7th edition), and several accessible introductions to psychology for the general trade market, including "Understand Psychology" (Teach Yourself series, John Murray) and the infographic "Instant Psychology" (Welbeck).

She has written  a number of articles for psychology-related magazines, edits two newsletters, is a member of the Society of Authors, a Fellow of the British Psychological Society, an Honorary Life Member of the Association for the Teaching of Psychology, and a member of Council of the International Test Commission.

She engages in consultancy on psychological matters for both government and private organisations, continues to write psychology books, and at the time of writing is President-Elect of the British Psychological Society, due to become President in July 2022.

Early life 
Nicola Jane Hayes was born in 1953 near Maidenhead in Berkshire, England. She lived in the area until 1964, when she moved to the Wirral. She attended Wallasey High School until 1971, and studied psychology at Leeds University from 1972 until 1975. She then worked as a Residential Social Worker with Leeds City Council from 1976 to 1979, when she left to take a PGCE in Further and Higher Education at Holly Bank, Huddersfield. She then undertook an M.Ed. at Leeds University from 1981 to 1983.

Psychology Education 
Nicky Hayes was instrumental in the development and establishment of pre-degree psychology in the UK.

Having taken a PGCE for Further and Higher Education from 1979 to 1980, she worked part-time teaching psychology at A and A/O level in various technical colleges in West Yorkshire. This was a new subject at the time, with many teachers working on their own with little or no support.

In 1982 she became an AO level examiner with the Joint Matriculation Board, and discovered such a diversity in the range and quality of the subject teaching that it was evident that more support was needed for teachers. She worked with others to establish that support through the Association for the Teaching of Psychology, acting as Hon Secretary from 1982 to 1984 and chair from 1984 to 1985.

This work resulted in publications, local groups, a resource bank and the establishment of an annual conference which continues to be the main CPD provider for teachers of pre-degree psychology.

In 1985 she joined the Membership and Qualifications Board of the British Psychological Society to raise the profile of this level of teaching in the psychological "establishment". Later in that year she became the first Hon. Secretary of a new Special Group for the Teaching of Psychology; from 1989 to 1995 served as the Registrar for a BPS Diploma in the Teaching of Psychology; and from 1993 to 1998 chaired the BPS Training Committee for the Applied Psychology of Teaching.

She was a founder member of the BPS Division established in 1997 which is now the Division of Academic Research and Teaching in Psychology, and in 1997 received the British Psychological Society Award for Distinguished Contributions to the Teaching of Psychology.

Nicky Hayes worked with a number of public exam boards in various roles from 1983 to 2002, examining A, AO level and GCSE psychology; acting as Chief Examiner and as Chair of Examiners, contributing to syllabus development and conducting scrutinies of Exam Board practices. She also contributed to the revision of the AQA syllabus for GCSE psychology in 2016–17.

She also made a significant impact on the popularity of the subject by producing a number of clear and accessible textbooks and study guides, which were helpful to both teachers and students. Her introductory books have been translated into several languages, and she was a keynote speaker on the value of pre-degree psychology at psychology teachers' conferences in Australia, Denmark and Russia.

Research methods 
Nicky Hayes has a broad range of knowledge and expertise in social research methods. She has taught research methods to a range of students, including psychology undergraduates and postgraduates, Environmental Health trainees, MBA trainees, and students on an Educational Psychology Doctorate programme.

Her textbook "Doing Psychological Research" had its first edition in 2000, and its second in 2020, and has been widely cited; and she has contributed chapters to a number of other texts*. She is also editor of two publications on psychometrics and is actively involved in the work of both the BPS Psychological Testing Centre and the International Test Commission.

Nicky Hayes was a founder member of the British Psychological Society's Qualitative Methods group, established during the 1990s to promote the use of qualitative method in psychological research. As a result of those discussions she edited a textbook illustrating the range of qualitative methods used by psychologists, and subsequently a comprehensive research and analysis textbook for students which treated qualitative approaches in detail. These publications made significant contributions to the increased acceptance of qualitative research in UK psychology.

Applied Psychology 
Nicky Hayes is also known for her ability to apply a range of psychological concepts across new areas. Her research in organisational psychology produced a model detailing the social psychological processes of social identification and social representation which underlie organisational cultures, and determine their efficacy in terms of employee engagement.

She has worked with SMEs to facilitate growth, drawing on psychological research into social identification to show how awareness of these mechanisms can contribute to positive employee experience and effective employee management. She also conducted research into the psychological contract and organisational commitment at work, and published two books on the psychology of effective teamworking.

Her broad knowledge of human psychological processes has been applied in a number of contexts**.

During the 1990s she participated in a number of AI workshops conducted by the European Society for the Study of Cognitive Systems, and contributed to day workshops and conferences for other professional groups.

From 1994 to 2002 she conducted research into the psychology of science communication, working with a number of interactive science centres, including the National Museum for Science and Technology in London, Techniquest in Cardiff and the Centre for Life in Newcastle.

This research articulated the psychological mechanisms underlying customer engagement with interactive science exhibits, and showed how they produce outcomes in the cognitive, conative, affective and behavioural domains. She has spoken on this area and presented the model at a number of national and international conferences, since which time it has been applied in both innovative and evaluative projects in science centres and other interactive arenas.

* Recent examples include:

 Morin, J-F, Olsson, C. & Atikan, E.Ö (eds) (2021)  Research Methods in the Social Sciences: an A-Z of key concepts  Oxford University Press
 Nichols, A.L. & Edlundand, J. E. (in press) The Cambridge Handbook of Research Methods and Statistics for the Social and Behavioral Sciences   Cambridge University Press

** Examples include:

 Hayes, N. (1997) Some cognitive implications of human social evolution    ESSCS Annual Workshop  Freiburg, Germany
 Hayes, N. (2001) Dispassionate Objectivity: the unreachable ideal?  National Society for Expert Witnesses, Sheffield, UK
 Hayes, N. (2000) Psychological Dimensions of interactive science exhibits  Proceedings of the XXVII International Congress of Psychology, Stockholm, 2000
 Hayes, N. (1999) Exploring Interactives: the psychological domain  Techniquest, Cardiff
 Hayes, N. (1999) Psychological dimensions of interactivity   2nd World Congress of Science Centres, Calcutta, India
 Hayes, N. (1998) The psychology of interactive science  British Interactive Group Conference, Herstmonceux, Sussex
 Hayes, N. (1996) Interactive science: the demands of the task   Ist World Congress of Science Centres, Finland
 Hayes,N. (1994) Are we getting through? The psychological basis of scientific communication  International Congress:  When Science becomes Culture  Montreal, Canada

Awards 
1985 Honorary Life Member of the Association for the Teaching of Psychology.

1997 British Psychological Society's Award for Distinguished Contributions to the Teaching of Psychology.

References 

Year of birth missing (living people)
Living people
Textbook writers
20th-century British women writers